The 2012–13 Primera Divisió is the eighteenth season of top-tier football in Andorra. It began in September 2012 and ended in April 2013. The defending champions are FC Lusitanos, who won their first championship in the previous season. The title was retained by Lusitanos.

Stadia and locations

Competition format
The participating teams first played a conventional round-robin schedule with every team playing each opponent once "home" and once "away" (in actuality, the designation of home and away was purely arbitrary as the clubs did not have their own grounds) for a total of 14 games. The league was then split up in two groups of four teams with each of them playing teams within their group in a home-and-away cycle of games. The top four teams competed for the championship. The bottom four clubs played for one direct relegation spot and one relegation play-off spot. Records earned in the First Round were taken over to the respective Second Rounds.

Promotion and relegation from 2011–12

FC Rànger's were relegated after last season due to finishing in 8th place. They were replaced by Segona Divisió champions FC Encamp.

Inter Club d'Escaldes, who finished last season in 7th place, and 2nd place Segona Divisió club UE Extremenya played a two-legged relegation play-off. Inter Club d'Escaldes won the playoff, 3–0 on aggregate, and remained in the Primera Divisió while Extremenya remained in the Segona Divisió.

First round

Second round

Championship Round

Relegation round

Relegation play-offs
The seventh-placed club in the league competed in a two-legged relegation play-off against the runners-up of the 2012–13 Segona Divisió, for one spot in 2013–14 Primera Divisió.

References

External links
 Official site 
  League321.com - Andorran football league tables, records & statistics database. 

Primera Divisió seasons
Andorra
1